Raquel Filipa Tavares (born 11 February 1985) is a Portuguese former Fado singer. In January 2020, she took a break from  her professional career to pursue a life away from the stage.

Career
Raquel Tavares won a popular fado song contest in Portugal: known as "Grande Noite do Fado”.

She sings regularly at “Bacalhau de Molho”, one of the most famous fado houses in Lisbon. She has performed all around Europe, including Paris, Rome and Madrid.

Her first album was released in 2006, the same year that she won the Amália Rodrigues Revelation Prize.

Her second album, Bairro, was released in May 2008.

She was once named one of the most representative Fado singers of the new generation.

Curiosities

In 2004, Raquel played a small part as a Fado singer in Mário Barroso's film "O Milagre Segundo Salomé" ("The Miracle According to Salomé"). 

She entered in the Eurovision Dance Contest 2008 with João Tiago, placing 8th.

Discography

Albums 
 1999 - Porque Canto Fado (Metro-Som)
 2006 - Raquel Tavares (Movieplay)
 2008 - Bairro (Movieplay)
 2016 - Raquel (Sony Music)

References

External links

 Raquel Tavares on Facebook

1985 births
Living people
Singers from Lisbon
Portuguese fado singers
21st-century Portuguese women singers
Golden Globes (Portugal) winners